The Torture Museum is a museum in the City of San Marino, San Marino.

History
The museum was established in 1966.

Exhibitions
The museum exhibits more than 100 tools for torture and punishments to people suspected of crimes, witchcraft or conspiracy. Many of the tools are the original tools used in the 16-17th century and some are the reconstructed ones from the original tools.

See also
 List of museums in San Marino

References

External links

  

1966 establishments in San Marino
Buildings and structures in the City of San Marino
Museums established in 1966
Museums in San Marino